Gurcharan Singh may refer to:
 Gurcharan Singh (boxer), Indian boxer and Olympian
 Gurcharan Singh (cricketer), Indian cricket coach and former cricketer
 Gurcharan Singh (painter), Indian figurative painter
 Gurcharan Singh Grewal, Indian field hockey player
 Gurcharan Singh Sekhon, Singaporean military officer
 Gurcharan Singh Tohra, Sikh politician
 Gurcharan Singh Bedi, Former Indian Air Force Air Marshal
 Gurcharan Singh, Indian Navy Rear Admiral